Fils or FILS may refer to:

People 
 Anton Fils (1733–1760), German composer
 Arthur Fils (born 2004), French tennis player
 Pascal Fils (born 1984), Canadian football player

Other uses 
 Fils (currency), a subdivision of currency used in many Arab countries
 Fils (river), in Germany
 Firestone Indy Lights Series, a developmental automobile racing series
 Fast initial link setup, in the IEEE 802.11ai wireless LAN standard

See also
 Fil (disambiguation)